Palumbia sinensis is a species of hoverfly in the family Syrphidae.

Distribution
China.

References

Eristalinae
Insects described in 1929
Diptera of Asia
Taxa named by Charles Howard Curran